Rick Taggart is a state representative from Grand Junction, Colorado. A Republican, Taggart represents Colorado House of Representatives District 55, which includes the communities of Grand Junction, Redlands, and Orchard Mesa in Mesa County.

Background
Taggart is a businessman and politician from Grand Junction, Colorado. His corporate experience includes senior positions in Marmot Mountain Works, The Timberland Company, and Swiss Army Brands. He has also worked at Colorado Mesa University in a management position and as a business teacher. He earned a bachelor's degree from Syracuse University and an MBA from the University of Phoenix.

Taggart served from 2015 to 2022 on the Grand Junction City Council. He served as mayor from 2017-2019.

Elections
In the 2022 Colorado House of Representatives election, Taggart defeated his Democratic Party opponent, winning 63.61% of the total votes cast.

References

External links
 Legislative website
 Campaign website

21st-century American politicians
Living people
Mayors of places in Colorado
Colorado city council members
Syracuse University alumni
University of Phoenix alumni
People from Grand Junction, Colorado
Year of birth missing (living people)
Republican Party members of the Colorado House of Representatives